Love Maggy is a 1921 British silent drama film directed by Fred LeRoy Granville and starring Peggy Hyland, Campbell Gullan and James Lindsay. It was made at Isleworth Studios as a sequel to the 1920 film The Honeypot.

Cast
 Peggy Hyland as Maggy Chalfont  
 Campbell Gullan as Lord Chalfont 
 James Lindsay as Fred Woolf  
 Maudie Dunham as Joan  
 Maidie Hope as Lady Susan  
 Lillian Hall-Davis as Alexandra Hersey  
 Alfred Drayton as De Preyne  
 Fred Thatcher as Lord Lancing  
 Mabel Terry-Lewis as Lady Shelford  
 Alfred Wood as Mr. Simmons  
 Saba Raleigh as Mrs. Simmons

References

Bibliography
 Quinlan, David. The illustrated encyclopedia of movie character actors. Harmony Books, 1986.

External links
 

1921 films
1921 drama films
British drama films
British silent feature films
Films directed by Fred LeRoy Granville
Films shot at Isleworth Studios
British sequel films
British black-and-white films
1920s English-language films
1920s British films
Silent drama films